Alyaksandr Viktaravich Vyazhevich (Aleksandr Viktorovich Vyazhevich; born 7 June 1970) is a former Belarusian football player.

Honours
Metallurg Molodechno
Belarusian SSR League champion: 1991
Soviet Amateur Cup winner: 1991

Belshina Bobruisk
Belarusian Premier League champion: 2001

References

External links
 

1970 births
Living people
Soviet footballers
Belarusian footballers
Belarus international footballers
Belarusian expatriate footballers
Expatriate footballers in Russia
Expatriate footballers in Cyprus
Russian Premier League players
Cypriot First Division players
Belarusian Premier League players
FC Molodechno players
FC Chernomorets Novorossiysk players
FC Dynamo Stavropol players
FC Dinamo Minsk players
Nea Salamis Famagusta FC players
FC Belshina Bobruisk players
FC Torpedo Minsk players
FC Chist players
Association football forwards